Nelson Peltz (born June 24, 1942) is an American billionaire businessman and investor. He is a founding partner, together with Peter W. May and Edward P. Garden, of Trian Fund Management, an alternative investment management fund based in New York. He is non-executive chairman of Wendy's Company, Sysco, and The Madison Square Garden Company. He is a former director of H.J. Heinz Company, Mondelēz International, and Ingersoll Rand and a former CEO of Triangle Industries.

Early life and education
Peltz was born to a Jewish family in 1942 in Brooklyn, New York, the son of Claire (née Wechsler; 1905–2007) and Maurice Herbert Peltz (1901–1977). He was the second of their two children, and grew up in the Cypress Hills section of Brooklyn, a sub-section of the East New York neighborhood.

He attended Horace Mann School in the Bronx. Peltz attended the undergraduate program at the Wharton School of the University of Pennsylvania starting in 1960, where he joined the fraternity of Phi Gamma Delta, but dropped out in 1963 and  never completed a degree.

Business career
In 1963, Peltz dropped out of the Wharton School with the intention of becoming a ski instructor in Oregon. However, he ended up driving a delivery truck for A. Peltz & Sons, a wholesale food distribution business founded by his grandfather in 1896, which delivered fresh produce and Snow Crop brand frozen food to restaurants in New York.

Peltz's father gave him free rein with the company, and over the next 15 years he and his older brother, Robert B. Peltz, grew the business, gradually shifting the product line from produce to institutional frozen foods. Over the next 10 years, Peltz bought up several food companies, and in 1973, he and his brother together with Peltz's business partner, Peter May, who joined Peltz in 1972, took their company, then called Flagstaff Corp., with $150 million in sales, public. In 1979, Peltz sold Flagstaff's foodservice business division to a group of investors. Two years later, the food service business went bankrupt and the lender asked Peltz to salvage their outstanding loan. Within a year, the loans were repaid as Peltz rebuilt the business.

In the 1980s, Peltz and his business partner, Peter May, who had joined Flagstaff as chief financial officer after having been its accountant, went looking for new acquisitions. In April 1983, the two bought a stake in vending-machine and wire company Triangle Industries Inc. with the idea of using it to make acquisitions, building it into a Fortune 100 industrial company and the largest packaging company in the world. Triangle was sold to Pechiney in 1988.

Triarc Companies, Inc 
In 1997, through an investment vehicle they controlled, Triarc Companies, Inc., Peltz and May acquired Snapple from Quaker Oats. Snapple, together with other beverage brands, was sold to Cadbury Schweppes in 2000. The Snapple turnaround was featured as a Harvard Business School case study.

In 2005, Peltz, May, and Ed Garden founded Trian Fund Management, L.P. As an activist investing firm, Trian has invested in such companies as Heinz, Cadbury, Kraft Foods, Ingersoll Rand, Wendy's, DuPont, Mondelēz, PepsiCo, State Street Corporation, Procter & Gamble and Family Dollar.

In 2006, Trian was involved in a proxy contest with Heinz to get five independent directors on the board of Heinz. Trian succeeded in getting two members on the board, including Peltz.

In 2007, Trian bought a 3% share of Cadbury-Schweppes (Dr Pepper Snapple). Cadbury Schweppes Americas Beverages was later spun off from the Cadbury Schweppes confectionery group. In 2007, Trian also bought $1.8 billion in shares of Kraft Foods, roughly 3% of the total equity of the food maker.

In April 2008, it was announced that Triarc Cos. would merge with burger chain Wendy's. The merger was completed on September 29, 2008. The new company was named Wendy's Arby's Group and traded on the New York Stock Exchange under the symbol WEN. On July 25, 2011, Wendy's Arby's sold Arby's to Roark Capital Group and changed its name to The Wendy's Company. According to CNBC, on February 15, 2011, Trian offered to buy Family Dollar for $55–60 per share.

In February 2011, Trian announced it had accumulated an 8% stake in the Family Dollar company and indicated a willingness to participate in a take private Leveraged Buyout (LBO) for the company with a total value of about $7 to $8 billion. This overture was rejected by the company management and board of directors. In September 2011, Ed Garden, Trian's Chief Investment Officer, joined the Family Dollar board.

In May 2022, Nelson Peltz announced that its management fund Trian Partners are looking into selling or merger for the burger chain. Trian Partners is the burger chain's largest share holder.

Ingersoll-Rand 
Peltz was appointed to the Ingersoll-Rand board of directors in 2012. The company announced major initiatives to enhance shareholder value in late 2012. In 2014, Peltz resigned from the Ingersoll-Rand board, after the spin-off of Allegion.

In August 2013, it was reported that Trian held an approximate $1.25 billion stake in DuPont.

In January 2014, as one of the company's largest shareholders, with a current beneficial ownership of more than 46 million shares, Peltz was appointed to the board of directors of global snacking company, Mondelēz International.

In February 2014, as a beneficial owner of approximately $1.2 billion of PepsiCo, Inc. common shares, Trian publicly released a letter to PepsiCo's board of directors and a white paper detailing why separating global snacks and beverages into two independent public companies would be the right long-term decision for the business and would create substantial value for shareholders. Trian said it would immediately begin to engage fellow shareholders in a public dialogue with the goal of creating a groundswell of support for a separation of snacks and beverages.

In May 2015, Trian was unsuccessful in a bitter proxy contest to appoint four of its nominees to the board of DuPont. Five months later the CEO of DuPont, Ellen Kullman, resigned; at the time DuPont acknowledged lower than expected earnings and the need to accelerate a cost-cutting plan.

In October 2015, Trian bought a $2.5 billion stake in General Electric.

Procter & Gamble 
In October 2017, Peltz tried but failed to acquire a seat on the board of Procter & Gamble, in which Trian has a 1.5% stake. On November 15, 2017, it was discovered that per a revision of all votes, which Peltz acknowledged to have resulted in a remarkably close battle, Peltz had in fact won the proxy battle, recognized as the largest in corporate history. On December 15, Procter & Gamble named Peltz to its board, although it stated that Peltz had nominally lost the proxy vote.

In February 2018, Peltz announced his departure from the board of Mondelez International, to be succeeded by Trian partner Peter May. In March 2018, Peltz joined the Procter & Gamble board of directors.

In March 2019, Peltz joined Canadian cannabis producer Aurora Cannabis. In June 2019, Peltz's Trian announced an investment in Ferguson, plc, a distributor of plumbing and heating products in North America.

Disney Proxy Fight 
In January 2023, Trian Fund Management owner Nelson Peltz, officially launched a proxy fight with Disney. Nelson Peltz did not support the reappointment of Bob Iger and the departure of  Bob Chapek in December 2022. Peltz's goal at the time was looking to get a board seat at Disney.  Peltz ended the proxy fight on February 9, 2023.

Personal life 

Peltz has been married three times. In 1964, he married Cynthia Abrams, daughter of Emerson Radio & Phonograph Corporation co-founder, Benjamin Abrams; they divorced in 1981. 

In 1985, he married his third wife, Claudia Heffner, a former fashion model, with whom he has eight children. Although Hefner never converted to Judaism, his sons were barmitzvahed.

Among Peltz's children are actors Nicola Peltz (born 1995) and Will Peltz (born 1986). His son Brad Peltz (born 1989) was drafted by the Ottawa Senators hockey team, which Nelson Peltz himself was once rumored to have an interest in buying. His daughter Nicola married Brooklyn Beckham (English footballer David Beckham's son), in a Jewish ceremony on April 9, 2022.

Peltz resides at his home Montsorrel, in Palm Beach, Florida. In 2015, he began a refurbishment and expansion project for the property. He also resides in Bedford, New York.

In 2020, Peltz organized a fundraiser in support of the re-election campaign of President Donald Trump, but following the storming of the United States Capitol on January6, 2021, Peltz said on CNBC on January7, "I voted for [Trump] in this past election in November. Today I'm sorry I did that."

Wealth and philanthropy

In February 2014, Forbes listed Peltz as one of the 25 highest-earning hedge fund managers in 2013, with total earnings of $430 million, ranked 16th.

According to Forbes Magazine, Peltz had a net worth of $1.51 billion as of February 2017. This made him the 432nd-richest person in the US. As of October 2021, his net worth was estimated at US$1.7 billion.

In 2005, Peltz was among 53 entities that contributed the maximum of $250,000 to the second inauguration of President George W. Bush. He is also a contributor to Jewish causes. Peltz has sat on the Board of Trustees of New York-Presbyterian Hospital since 2019.

Awards and recognition 
Peltz was said by the National Association of Corporate Directors (NACD) in 2010, 2011, and 2012 to be among the most influential people in global corporate governance.

References

External links
Trian Fund Management, L.P. website
Triarc Companies, Inc. info
Nelson and Claudia Peltz Family Foundation Tax Exempt/NonProfit Organization Information

1942 births
American billionaires
American chairpersons of corporations
American chief executives of financial services companies
American chief executives of food industry companies
American corporate directors
American hedge fund managers
American investors
American political fundraisers
Businesspeople from New York City
Corporate raiders
Jewish American philanthropists
Living people
People from Brooklyn
People from Bedford, New York
People from Palm Beach, Florida
Private equity and venture capital investors
Wharton School of the University of Pennsylvania alumni
Wendy's International
Peltz family
Philanthropists from New York (state)
21st-century American Jews